Enoplognatha marmorata, the marbled cobweb spider, is a species of cobweb spider in the family Theridiidae. It is found in North America.

References

Theridiidae
Articles created by Qbugbot
Spiders described in 1850